Moston railway station in Moston, Manchester, England, is 4 miles (6 km) north of Manchester Victoria on the Caldervale Line managed by Northern.

Moston station opened in February 1872. It is on Hollinwood Avenue, in New Moston, and is unstaffed, the station buildings having been demolished in the late 1990s. Tickets must be purchased on the train.

Services 

On Monday to Saturday daytimes, there is now a half-hourly service in operation here once again. Train operator Arriva Rail North (under the brand name Northern) had committed to reinstate the 30-minute frequency as part of its successful 2015 franchise bid. Previous operator Serco-Abellio had cut the off-peak frequency here to hourly in May 2014.

On Sundays the Southport - Wigan Wallgate - Manchester - Blackburn - Clitheroe service calls hourly each way.

Gallery

Notes

References

External links 

Railway stations in Manchester
DfT Category F2 stations
Former Lancashire and Yorkshire Railway stations
Railway stations in Great Britain opened in 1872
Northern franchise railway stations